William González (born 28 August 1970) is a Colombian fencer. He competed in the team épée event at the 1988 Summer Olympics.

References

1970 births
Living people
Colombian male épée fencers
Olympic fencers of Colombia
Fencers at the 1988 Summer Olympics
Pan American Games medalists in fencing
Pan American Games silver medalists for Colombia
Pan American Games bronze medalists for Colombia
Fencers at the 1991 Pan American Games
Fencers at the 1995 Pan American Games
Fencers at the 1999 Pan American Games
20th-century Colombian people
21st-century Colombian people